The 2009–10 Florida Gators women's basketball team represented the University of Florida in the sport of basketball during the 2009–10 women's college basketball season.  The Gators competed in Division I of the National Collegiate Athletic Association (NCAA) and the Southeastern Conference (SEC).  They were led by head coach Amanda Butler, and played their home games in the O'Connell Center on the university's Gainesville, Florida campus.

Offseason
 June 8, 2009: Gators center Azania Stewart traveled to her native country of England, to try out for Great Britain’s Under-20 University World Games Team, which competed in Belgrade, July 1–12

Regular season

Roster

Schedule

References

External links
Official Site

Florida Gators women's basketball seasons
Florida
Florida Gators women's basketball team
Florida Gators women's basketball team